Seeqnce is a startup accelerator based in Beirut, Lebanon. The company advises on best practices in building startup ecosystems.

History 
The company was founded in 2010 by Samer Karam, who served as Chairman and General Manager. In July 2011, Seeqnce launched its state-of-the-art space in the heart of Beirut (Hamra). In 2012, it successfully launched Lebanon's 1st startup accelerator program, with 436 entrepreneurs from 30 countries. On August 24, 2012, Seeqnce announced its investment in 8 startups.

Approach

Seeqnce borrows from best practices pioneered by accelerators such as Y Combinator and Techstars. However, due to the differences between the MENA region and the US, it developed culturally adapted methodology.

The lack of expertise, the lack of knowledge on startup accelerators as well as the risk-averse culture are among the factors which call for a need for modifications when applying western methods in the region.

One of the adjustments Seeqnce made to meet region's needs is the duration of the program which is 6 months. This is twice the duration of Y Combinator's program. Moreover, Seeqnce is funding startups once a year while Y Combinator is funding 2 batches of startups a year.

The profile of applicants is another differentiator of the program. Seeqnce requires from the individuals who will go successfully through the selection process to form teams based on members’ expertise. Each team is composed of a business person, a developer, and a designer. This is not the case with Y Combinator where no limitations are put in this particular context.

Program
The program [SqP] is a year-long web / mobile business creation process that is composed of two phases: Selection and Acceleration.

300 entrepreneurs have the chance to apply and go through a series of challenges. The best eight Arab world's web and mobile startups join the second phase of the program, which lasts for six months at Seeqnce's offices.

After operating for year and a half, Wamda elected Seeqnce as one of "the top 10 accelerators" in the MENA region.

Seeqnce Accelerator Program 2012
Seeqnce selected the following eight startups to enter into the Acceleration phase: eTobb, Kactus, Rikbit, Presella, Ikimuk, Yoofers, and et3arraf.

Another startup Seeqnce accelerated is Cinemoz described by TechCrunch as "on its way to becoming the Hulu of the Arab world."

References

External links
Official Website

Companies based in Beirut
Startup accelerators
2010 establishments in Lebanon
Service companies of Lebanon